is a Japanese model and actress who is represented by the talent agency Ten Carat.

Biography
Kikuchi graduated from Chiba University's Faculty of Engineering of Urban Environment Systems Department. Her bachelor's degree is engineering. Kikuchi was active in many magazines like Linen. She appeared in magazines Non-no and Pretty Style in the past. Kikuchi was serialized in PS Akiko Kikuchi no Michikusa. In 2006, she was appointed to the supporters of the link affiliate site, Share Shogakukan Joint Charity. In addition to starring in films and television dramas, Kikuchi appeared in advertisements often. She has a reputation for illustrations and fashion style that had a unique view of the world.

Filmography

TV series

Films

References

External links
 Official profile 
 

Japanese female models
1982 births
Living people
Actresses from Gifu Prefecture
Chiba University alumni
Models from Gifu Prefecture